RSC Sessions Perdues is a mixtape by French rapper Nessbeal. It was released on April 14, 2009 by Nouvelle Donne Music in France, and peaked at number 90 on the French Albums Charts.

A collector's edition re-release of the mixtape entitled RSC Sessions Perdues: Édition Collector was released on June 15, 2009 by Nouvelle Donne Music and Musicast on iTunes.

Track listing

Chart performance

Release history

References

2009 mixtape albums
Nessbeal albums
French-language albums